Ondel-ondel is a large puppet figure featured in Betawi folk performance of Jakarta, Indonesia. Ondel-ondel is an icon of Jakarta. Ondel-ondel are utilized for livening up festivals or for welcoming guests of honor, usually in pairs. Ondel-ondel is one of a few Indonesian folk performances that has survived modernization and is still being regularly performed.

The musical accompaniment for the ondel-ondel performance varies with regions, occasions and groups of performances.

History

Archaic and colonial period

Traditionally, the figure of ondel-ondel was known as barongan, a word derived from barong, a protective spirit that can be found across the animistic Austronesian culture long before the arrival of Hinduism. The figure was performed around villages to provide protection against calamities or for warding off wandering evil spirits. It was thought as a representation of the ancestors protecting the village.

The first record of ondel-ondel is probably by British merchant William Scot who noted that een reus raksasa ("a giant Rakshasa") was one of the figures included in the procession led by Prince Jayakarta Wijayakrama to celebrate the circumcision of 10 years old Prince Abdul Mafakhir in the year 1605.

Up until the modern colonial period, ondel-ondel figure was recorded to have a gruesome facial feature such as large fangs and menacing goggle-eyes, similar to the Balinese Barong or Rangda figure. The ondel-ondel was performed on the streets and asked by-passers for opium. When opium was banned in the Dutch East Indies, the ondel-ondel would ask for cigars instead, which is done by placing a cigar on their mouth. During this period, local Betawi people still believe that ondel-ondel can protect a village against disease such as chickenpox. Ondel-ondel performance was recorded by American writer E.R. Scidmore who visited Batavia in late 19th-century who noted a street performance in the form of dances, which could be the ondel-ondel performance.

The construction of an ondel-ondel must follow a certain ritual. Before the construction of an ondel-ondel, the maker must gives offering in the form of incense, kembang tujuh rupa, and a rice porridge. The offering was intended to ensure the process of making ondel-ondel is a smooth one and to allow benevolent spirit to enter the figure.

Modern custom

After the independence of Indonesia, the function of ondel-ondel was shifted from a protective spirit figure into an iconic figure of entertainment. Governor of Jakarta Ali Sadikin (1966-1977), in an attempt to introduce a modern Jakarta, decided to modernize the ondel-ondel by removing some of the gruesome elements and making them more friendly-looking. Around this period, ondel-ondel was made a mascot of Jakarta and were always included in celebratory events such as inauguration of new buildings, welcoming guests of honor, or attending a wedding ceremony. Ondel-ondel performance is then always accompanied with Betawi music such as tanjidor or gambang kromong.

The figure

Ondel-ondel is a hollow figure about 2.5 meters tall and dressed in brightly colored garments which consists of shoulder belt (kain selempang dada). The head of ondel-ondel is typically made of wood. Ondel-ondel wears a headdress known as kembang kelape (coconut's flower) which is made from dried coconut leaves that have been shredded lengthways and is wrapped with colorful paper. Ondel-ondel are always showcased in pairs of male and female. The male puppet is traditionally has its face painted red, while the female is painted white. The body of ondel-ondel is constructed of bamboo which is relatively light and is lifted by one person from the inside of the puppet.

Similar performances

A form of folk performance similar to ondel-ondel is practiced in other parts of Indonesia. In the Pasundan region, it is known as badawang, while in Central Java it is called barongan buncis. In Bali, it is better known as barong landung.

See also

Barong (mythology)
Topeng
Higantes

References

External links

Ondel-Ondel Betawi Street Performance in Jakarta on YouTube
"Nyok Kite Nonton Ondel-Ondel" dance on YouTube

Indonesian culture
Puppets